Revelations is the third studio album by English post-punk band Killing Joke, released in July 1982 by E.G. via Polydor Records. It was recorded in Cologne, Germany and produced by Conny Plank, making it their first album not to be self-produced. Since bassist Youth departed from the band after the album's release, Revelations was the band's last album to feature the original line-up (until their 2010 album Absolute Dissent).

Release 

Revelations was released in July 1982 by E.G. Records. It reached number 12 in the UK Albums Chart. Youth was disappointed the way the album turned out, as it later contributed to him leaving the band, saying "It came out a bit dirgy".

Two singles were released from the album: "Empire Song" and "Chop-Chop". "Empire Song" was performed on Top of the Pops, but without singer Jaz Coleman, who had departed for Iceland fearing nuclear holocaust at the time.

A remastered version was released in 2005, including an alternate recording of "We Have Joy".

Reception 

Revelations has generally received mixed-to-favourable reception by critics. Nick Lancaster of Drowned in Sound praised the album, calling it "a less individual work – record company pressures and an outside producer necessarily toning down the band's nihilistic excesses – but it's all the better for it." Christopher Gray of Austin Chronicle called it "faster" and "sleeker" than previous albums. Fact put the album at no. 11 on their list titled "20 Best: Goth Records Ever Made". In negative retrospective reviews, AllMusic believed the album had a "lack of cohesion and direction", while  Trouser Press wrote that it "suffers from an uninvolving lethargy".

Track listing

Personnel 
 Killing Joke
 Jaz Coleman – vocals, synthesizer
 Kevin "Geordie" Walker – guitar
 Martin "Youth" Glover – bass guitar
 Paul Ferguson – drums, vocals

 Technical
 Conny Plank – recording engineer, mixing, production
 Rob O'Connor - sleeve design

Charts

References

External links 

 

1982 albums
Killing Joke albums
Albums produced by Conny Plank
E.G. Records albums